John Antonelli may refer to:

 Johnny Antonelli (1930–2020), American baseball pitcher
 John Antonelli (infielder) (1915–1990), American baseball infielder